Hatsavan is a village in the Sisian Municipality of the Syunik Province in Armenia.

Toponymy 
The village was previously known as Sisian.

Demographics 
The Statistical Committee of Armenia reported its population was 280 in 2010, up from 262 at the 2001 census.

Notable people
Ashot Avagyan (1958-), Armenian painter

References 

Populated places in Syunik Province